Selinger (also Sellinger) is an Ashkenazi Jewish surname of German origin. It may refer to:
 
 Arie Selinger (born 1937), Israeli volleyball coach
 Avital Haim Selinger (born 1959), Israeli volleyball player
 Emily McGary Selinger (1848–1927), American painter, writer, poet, educator
 Greg Selinger (born 1951), Canadian politician
 Patricia Selinger, American computer scientist
 Shlomo Selinger (born 1928), an Israeli sculptor
 Howard Andrew Selinger (born 1956), American Physician, Family Medicine

German-language surnames
Jewish surnames